Richard Lee Baney (born November 1, 1946) is an American former Major League Baseball right-handed pitcher. He was drafted by the Boston Red Sox with the ninth pick of the secondary phase of the 1966 Major League Baseball draft, and later drafted by the Seattle Pilots from the Red Sox as the 33rd pick in the 1968 expansion draft. He played for the Pilots (1969) and the Cincinnati Reds (1973–1974).

He was dealt along with Buzz Stephen from the Milwaukee Brewers to the Baltimore Orioles for Dave May before the trade deadline on June 15, 1970.

During a three-year baseball career, Baney compiled a 4–1 record, three saves, 38 strikeouts, and a 4.28 earned run average in 42 games (three starts).

He posed nude for Playgirl in 1977.

After his retirement as a pitcher, Baney went into business with his father as a general contractor. As of 2006, he was living in Tustin, California and working as a real estate investor and property manager.

References

External links
, or Baseball Gauge, or Baseball Library, or Retrosheet, or Venezuelan Professional Baseball League

1946 births
Living people
American expatriate baseball players in Canada
American expatriate baseball players in Mexico
Arizona Instructional League Pilots players
Baseball players from California
Birmingham A's players
Cincinnati Reds players
Florida Instructional League Red Sox players
Hawaii Islanders players
Indianapolis Indians players
Leones del Caracas players
Major League Baseball pitchers
Mexican League baseball pitchers
Mineros de Coahuila players
Navegantes del Magallanes players
American expatriate baseball players in Venezuela
People from Fullerton, California
Pittsfield Red Sox players
Portland Beavers players
Puerto Rico Boricuas players
Seattle Pilots players
Rochester Red Wings players
Sportspeople from Fullerton, California
Vancouver Mounties players
Waterloo Hawks (baseball) players
Winston-Salem Red Sox players